Abdul Aziz Hassan Al-Hadba Abdul Kareem (born 18 October 1952) is a Kuwaiti sprinter. He competed in the men's 200 metres at the 1976 Summer Olympics.

References

External links
 

1952 births
Living people
Athletes (track and field) at the 1976 Summer Olympics
Kuwaiti male sprinters
Olympic athletes of Kuwait
Place of birth missing (living people)
Athletes (track and field) at the 1974 Asian Games
Asian Games competitors for Kuwait
20th-century Kuwaiti people
21st-century Kuwaiti people